Roger R. Nicole (December 10, 1915 – December 11, 2010) was a native Swiss Reformed Baptist theologian and proponent of Christian egalitarianism and biblical inerrancy. He was an associate editor for the New Geneva Study Bible, assisted in the translation of the New International Version, and was a founding member of both the International Council on Biblical Inerrancy and the Evangelical Theological Society, serving as president of the latter in 1956.

Early life and education 
Nicole was born to Swiss parents December 10, 1915, in Charlottenburg, Germany. During his childhood, the family moved back to Switzerland, where he lived until 1935. He earned his M.A. from Sorbonne, France, and then emigrated to the United States to continue his studies. He received a B.D. (1939), S.T.M. (1940), and Th.D. (1943) from Gordon Divinity School, his Ph.D. (1967) from Harvard University, and his D.D. (1978) from Wheaton College. In 1946, Nicole married Annette Cyr (1917 - 2008).

Career 
In 1944, Nicole joined the faculty at what was then called Gordon Divinity School, now known as Gordon Conwell Theological Seminary. He was appointed professor of theology in 1949, where he remained until retiring in 1986. He continued to teach theology during his retirement at Reformed Theological Seminary, Orlando, Florida. A devotee of mathematics and prolific writer, he produced some 100 articles and contributed to fifty books and reference works. A bibliophile and distinguished librarian with a massive collection, he owned Calvin's Commentaries on the Gospels and Acts and other volumes from the 16th and 17th centuries. The library of Reformed Theological Seminary in Orlando contains over twenty thousand of his personal books. They take up one half of the current library.

Legacy 
Respected internationally for his Christian statesmanship and scholarship, he was an acknowledged expert in the thought of Reformation leader John Calvin. Evangelical commentator David F. Wells dedicated his 1985 release, Reformed Theology in America, simply “to Roger Nicole, a man of God.” J. I. Packer has written this tribute to Nicole: "Awesome for brain power, learning and wisdom, endlessly patient and courteous in his gentle geniality, and beloved by a multitude as pastor, mentor and friend."

Other interests
An avid philatelist, Nicole had a personal collection of approximately one million stamps. He also had a collection of six thousand mystery novels.

Selected works
Nicole has written more than 100 articles and contributed to 50 books and reference works, including

Thesis

Books

 - Nicole writes the forward
 - Nicole was Associate Editor (a name change for the "New Geneva Study Bible")

Chapters

Other
 "Christians for Biblical Equality: Statement on Men, Women and Biblical Equality" Contributor. Minneapolis: Christians for Biblical Equality, 1989.

Festschriften

References 

American Calvinist and Reformed theologians
Swiss Calvinist and Reformed theologians
1915 births
2010 deaths
Gordon–Conwell Theological Seminary alumni
People from Orlando, Florida
Harvard University alumni
University of Paris alumni
American philatelists
Wheaton College (Illinois) alumni
20th-century Calvinist and Reformed theologians
21st-century Calvinist and Reformed theologians